Anton Reinartz (26 December 1926 – 31 October 2002) was a German rower. He competed in the men's eight event at the 1952 Summer Olympics.

References

1926 births
2002 deaths
German male rowers
Olympic rowers of Germany
Rowers at the 1952 Summer Olympics
Rowers from Cologne